Dan Woodley (born December 29, 1967) is an American former professional ice hockey player who played 5 games in the National Hockey League for the Vancouver Canucks during the 1987–88 NHL season. Selected 7th overall by the Canucks in the 1986 NHL Entry Draft, Woodley turned professional in 1987. After his time in the NHL he played in various minor leagues before retiring in 1995.

Playing career
Woodley was born in Oklahoma City, Oklahoma. He was selected 7th overall in the 1986 NHL Entry Draft by the Canucks. He helped the Portland Winter Hawks to the 1986 Memorial Cup Finals. He turned pro in 1987–88 and had a solid season, recording 66 points in 69 IHL games and scoring 2 goals in 5 games with the Canucks.

However, after general manager Jack Gordon was replaced by Pat Quinn, Woodley was sent to Milwaukee to start the 1988–89 season in the IHL. He was traded in a swap of first round picks, to the Montreal Canadiens in exchange for Jose Charbonneau. He finished the year in Sherbrooke, Quebec on the first place Canadiens farm team with 18 goals. Following two more mediocre seasons for Montreal, he requested to be bought out in 1991. He then moved to the ECHL and played four more seasons before retiring in 1995.

Woodley's lack of success (5 games played 2 goals) was surprising, given his high place in the 1986 draft. No player who was drafted higher than Woodley in the 1980s played fewer than his 5 NHL games, and he was one of only three top-10 picks (Jason Herter and Dan Gratton being the others) to play fewer than 10 NHL games. In contrast, future Hockey Hall of Fame defender Brian Leetch, was selected 2 picks later than Woodley by the New York Rangers.

Post-playing career
In 2007 Woodley became the Regis Jesuit High School, in Aurora, Colorado, varsity team. In his third year with the team, the 2007–2008 Regis Jesuit HS team posted an overall record of 20-1-1 and captured the state high school championship with a double-overtime 3–2 victory. The Regis team went undefeated in 2008–2009 to win their second consecutive state championship. In 2012 Woodley's team captured their third state title under his guidance going 22–1. Woodley coached Regis Jesuit hockey to the state final four for five consecutive years, and built Regis Jesuit into a hockey powerhouse in the state. Woodley also coached a youth hockey team in Colorado.

Personal life
Woodley is the son of Dave Woodley, who was playing for the Oklahoma City Blazers of the Central Hockey League when Dan was born. Dan Woodley has the distinction of being the only Oklahoma native ever selected in the first round of the NHL draft. He spent his early childhood in places such as Oklahoma, Arizona and Oregon (while his father was playing minor league pro hockey) as well as in Victoria, British Columbia, where he learned to play junior hockey. Woodley lives in Denver, Colorado with his family.

Career statistics

Awards
1987–88: Ken McKenzie Trophy

References

External links

1967 births
Albany Choppers players
American men's ice hockey centers
Flint Bulldogs players
Flint Spirits players
Fredericton Canadiens players
Ice hockey people from Oklahoma
Kansas City Blades players
Living people
Milwaukee Admirals (IHL) players
Muskegon Fury players
National Hockey League first-round draft picks
Portland Winterhawks players
Saginaw Wheels players
Sherbrooke Canadiens players
Sportspeople from Oklahoma City
Summerland Buckaroos players
Vancouver Canucks draft picks
Vancouver Canucks players
Winston-Salem Thunderbirds players